The State Library of Turkmenistan is located in Ashgabat, Turkmenistan.

History

Turkmen Soviet Socialist Republic 
The library was established in 1895.

Turkmenistan 
As of 2006, the library had a collection of 5 million items including books, maps, manuscripts, dissertations, journals, and newspapers; there were about 22,000 members. Book exhibitions were regularly held both in its premises and provincial libraries. Yet, the library played an insignificant role in society, and as of 2007, remained the only Central Asian library not to join the Library Assembly of Eurasia. 

In 2005, the library received funds to replace its card catalogs with an online public access catalog (OPAC); as of 2012, no progress has been made. Internet literacy among librarians remained low, as of 2012. Statistics on the publication of books in Turkmenistan remain unavailable, and the national bibliography has been stale for years.

See also
 List of national libraries

References

Libraries in Turkmenistan
Turkmenistan
Libraries established in 1895
Ashgabat
1895 establishments in the Russian Empire